Maerua is a genus of plants in the family Capparaceae, with its centre of diversity in Africa, though some species extend their range as far north as the Levant, and as far east as the Indian subcontinent and mainland Southeast Asia. Among its species:
 Maerua acuminata Oliver
 Maerua andradae Wild
 Maerua angolensis DC.
 Maerua brunnescens Wild
 Maerua cafra (DC.) Pax
 Maerua crassifolia Forssk.
 Maerua duchesnei (De Wild.) F.White
 Maerua elegans R.Wilczek
 Maerua juncea Pax
Maerua koratensis
 Maerua oblongifolia (Forssk.) A.Rich.
 Maerua racemulosa Gilg & Gilg-Ben.

 Maerua scandens (Klotzsch) Gilg

References

External links

 
Taxa named by Peter Forsskål
Taxonomy articles created by Polbot